The Kolmogorov backward equation (KBE) (diffusion) and its adjoint sometimes known as the Kolmogorov forward equation (diffusion) are partial differential equations (PDE) that arise in the theory of continuous-time continuous-state Markov processes.  Both were published by Andrey Kolmogorov in 1931.  Later it was realized that the forward equation was already known to physicists under the name Fokker–Planck equation;  the KBE on the other hand was new.

Informally, the Kolmogorov forward equation addresses the following problem.  We have information about the state x of the system at time t (namely a probability distribution ); we want to know the probability distribution of the state at a later time .  The adjective 'forward' refers to the fact that  serves as the initial condition and the PDE is integrated forward in time (in the common case where the initial state is known exactly,  is a Dirac delta function centered on the known initial state).

The Kolmogorov backward equation on the other hand is useful when we are interested at time t in whether at a future time s the system will be in a given subset of states B, sometimes called the target set. The target is described by a given function  which is equal to 1 if state x is in the target set at time s, and zero otherwise. In other words, the indicator function for the set B. We want to know for every state x at time  what is the probability of ending up in the target set at time s (sometimes called the hit probability).  In this case  serves as the final condition of the PDE, which is integrated backward in time, from s to t.

Formulating the Kolmogorov backward equation
Assume that the system state  evolves according to the stochastic differential equation

then the Kolmogorov backward equation is

Historically, the KBE was developed before the Feynman–Kac formula (1949).

Formulating the Kolmogorov forward equation
With the same notation as before, the corresponding Kolmogorov forward equation is

For more on this equation see Fokker–Planck equation.

See also
Kolmogorov equations

References

Parabolic partial differential equations
Stochastic differential equations